Hynek Hromada (16 April 1935 – 23 March 2012) was a Czech sports shooter. He competed at the 1968 Summer Olympics and the 1972 Summer Olympics.

References

1935 births
2012 deaths
Czech male sport shooters
Olympic shooters of Czechoslovakia
Shooters at the 1968 Summer Olympics
Shooters at the 1972 Summer Olympics
Sportspeople from Bratislava
20th-century Czech people